Kyle Seeback  (born August 19, 1970) is a Canadian politician and lawyer, who was elected as the Member of Parliament (MP) for Dufferin—Caledon in the 2019 election. He also represented the riding of Brampton West from 2011 to 2015. He was defeated by Sonia Sidhu in the riding of Brampton South during the 2015 Canadian federal election. He is a member of the Conservative Party of Canada.

Prior to entering federal politics, Seeback was an employee at Simmons Da Silva & Sinton LLP.

Seeback and his family moved to Amaranth, Ontario in 2009. He has resided in Orangeville, Ontario since 2017.

Controversies
On December 3, 2013, Seeback is reported to have called his Conservative colleague Brad Butt a "bitch" during an exchange in the House of Commons. Seeback apologized for his "unparliamentary language" the following day.

Electoral record

References

External links

1970 births
Living people
Conservative Party of Canada MPs
Lawyers in Ontario
Members of the House of Commons of Canada from Ontario
People from Orangeville, Ontario
Politicians from Brampton
University of Nebraska alumni
University of Western Ontario alumni
21st-century Canadian politicians